Federal State Unitary Enterprise "Guard" is governmental militarized security organization of the National Guard of Russia.

History 
In 2005, the security organization was established under the Ministry of the Interior of Russia. The enterprise has 80 branches in the regions of Russia, representing the services of physical, paramilitary protection, panel guard, installation and maintenance of security systems. 

In 2016 by the Decree of the President of Russia, the organization became a part of the National Guard of Russia. The general director is the colonel of the reserve Stanislav Osipov.

References 

National Guard of Russia
Defence companies of Russia
Security companies of Russia
Guard